Kingdom City is a village in Callaway County, Missouri, United States. It is part of the Jefferson City Metropolitan Statistical Area. The population was 128 at the 2010 census. The village lies north of the intersection of Interstate 70 and U.S. Route 54.

History
Kingdom City has its origins in the building of US Route 40 in 1925, at the same time US Route 54 was being planned with the intention of intersecting US 40 somewhere along the route. The city of Fulton had hoped for US 40 to go from Columbia through Fulton and intersect US 54 in their city, but the final decision had the highways intersect in what would become Kingdom City, which was then just a rural farm and forested area south of McCredie. McCredie residents fought so hard for the highway that they staged a parade through the heart of Fulton with banners that read "54-40 or Fight". When the road was being built and huge numbers of workers were brought in to do the work, McCredie became a boom town, with future Kingdom City receiving its first gas station and a two-story hotel, which (however) burned down in 1930.

Since the area had no name at the time the intersection was referred to only as the "Y", with people in Fulton wanting to name it "North Fulton" and the people in McCredie naming it "South McCredie". The Kingdom Oil Company, owned by B.P. (Bernard Parker) Beamer, suggested Kingdom City, in reflection of the nickname for Callaway County. Through the 1920s and 30s numerous dance halls, restaurants, cafés, and hotels would come and go in Kingdom City. In 1965, Gasper's (which became a local landmark) opened for business. In 1970, the McCredie Post Office moved to Kingdom City and took the community's name. This was the same year Kingdom City incorporated as a village and included the former unincorporated community of McCredie.

The Richland Christian Church was listed on the National Register of Historic Places in 2001.

Geography
Kingdom City is located along U.S. Route 54 approximately one half mile north of I-70. McKinney Creek flows past the south edge of the community and Auxvasse Creek passes two miles to the north. The town of Auxvasse lies about five miles north along Route 54.

Demographics

2010 census
As of the census of 2010, there were 128 people, 49 households, and 34 families living in the village. The racial makeup of the village was 93.0% White, 6.3% African American, and 0.8% from two or more races. Hispanic or Latino of any race were 0.8% of the population.

There were 49 households, of which 24.5% had children under the age of 18 living with them, 53.1% were married couples living together, 8.2% had a female householder with no husband present, 8.2% had a male householder with no wife present, and 30.6% were non-families. 24.5% of all households were made up of individuals, and 10.2% had someone living alone who was 65 years of age or older. The average household size was 2.61 and the average family size was 3.09.

The median age in the village was 40 years. 22.7% of residents were under the age of 18; 8.6% were between the ages of 18 and 24; 23.4% were from 25 to 44; 25.8% were from 45 to 64; and 19.5% were 65 years of age or older. The gender makeup of the village was 50.8% male and 49.2% female.

2000 census
As of the census of 2000, there were 121 people, 51 households, and 36 families living in the village. The population density was 89.3 people per square mile (34.6/km2). There were 54 housing units at an average density of 39.9 per square mile (15.4/km2). The racial makeup of the village was 90.91% White, 6.61% African American, 0.83% Native American, and 1.65% from two or more races.

There were 51 households, out of which 29.4% had children under the age of 18 living with them, 54.9% were married couples living together, 11.8% had a female householder with no husband present, and 29.4% were non-families. 21.6% of all households were made up of individuals, and 13.7% had someone living alone who was 65 years of age or older. The average household size was 2.37 and the average family size was 2.69.

In the village, the population was spread out, with 21.5% under the age of 18, 5.0% from 18 to 24, 23.1% from 25 to 44, 32.2% from 45 to 64, and 18.2% who were 65 years of age or older. The median age was 45 years. For every 100 females, there were 108.6 males. For every 100 females age 18 and over, there were 90.0 males.

The median income for a household in the village was $35,417, and the median income for a family was $34,583. Males had a median income of $28,125 versus $17,750 for females. The per capita income for the village was $16,978. None of the population and none of the families were below the poverty line.

Sources
 [https://books.google.com/books?id=-6o69F5bZ68C&pg=PA301&dq=%22callaway+county%22&as_brr=1 William S. Bryan and Robert Rose, A History of the Pioneer Families of Missouri, with numerous sketches, anecdotes, adventures, etc., relating to Early Days in Missouri], St. Louis, Missouri: Bryan, Brand & Co., 1876

References

External links

Villages in Callaway County, Missouri
Jefferson City metropolitan area
Villages in Missouri